Vani Sateesh is a Carnatic vocalist.

Music Training

Vani Sateesh's initial training was under the tutelage of her uncle Bellary M. Sheshagiri Achar. She later learnt from her father Bellary M. Venkateshachar and then from her brother Bellary M Raghavendra. She is currently under the tutelage of Padmabhushana Sri P.S.Narayanaswamy, direct disciple of Sangeetha Kalanidhi Semmangudi Srinivasa Iyer.

Performance

Vani started performing at a young age. Her first concert was at the age of 10; since then she has given numerous concerts both in India and abroad. In her earlier days, she gave numerous tala vadya concerts. She has also performed many jugalbandi with known Hindustani classical musicians. Vani Sateesh is an "A" grade artist of All India Radio and a "B High" Graded Composer of All India Radio. She has completed her Master in Music from University of Mysore and also has received an Indian Government Scholarship for Young Artists.

References
Concert Review April 2009

Concert Review June 2009

External links
Official website

Women Carnatic singers
Carnatic singers
Singers from Bangalore
Living people
Indian women classical singers
20th-century Indian singers
20th-century Indian women singers
Women musicians from Karnataka
Year of birth missing (living people)